Major-General Benjamin Gottlieb "Barend" Viljoen  (13 April 19081995)  was a South African military commander.

Military career 
He joined the South African Air Force in 1927, and served in World War II. He also served as ADC to the Governor General of the Union of South Africa and to the King of Greece. He was Air Chief of Staff from 23 September 1956 to 30 April 1965.

Honours and awards
He was awarded the Order of the British Empire in 1944.

See also
 List of South African military chiefs
 South African Air Force

References

|-

1908 births
1995 deaths
Afrikaner people
South African people of Dutch descent
South African Air Force generals
Officers of the Order of the British Empire
Chiefs of the South African Air Force
South African Air Force personnel of World War II